Gustiana is a genus of moths of the family Noctuidae. The genus was erected by Francis Walker in 1861.

Species
Gustiana abditalis (Walker, [1859]) Brazil (Rio de Janeiro)
Gustiana risoria (Dognin, 1914) Paraguay

References

Herminiinae